Boullanger Island lies off the coast of Western Australia and covers an area of about . The nearest settlement is the mainland town of Jurien Bay.

The Park protects an important section of Western Australia's central west coast, including Boullanger, Whitlock and Escape islands.

Both Boullanger Island and Jurien Bay were named on 1 July 1801 by the French expedition led by Captain Nicolas Baudin aboard the Géographe. Boullanger Island honours the cartographer of the expedition, Charles-Pierre Boullanger. Jurien Bay honours Charles Marie Vicomte Jurien (1763–1836), a French naval administrator.

Fauna & flora
The island is inhabited by an endemic species of marsupial mouse, Sminthopsis boullangerensis, the Boullanger Island dunnart. It was formerly considered a subspecies of the grey-bellied dunnart (S. griseoventer), for which reason it was not assessed by the IUCN in 2008 (although it was classed as critically endangered in the 1996 list). The EPBC Act classifies the Boullanger Island dunnart as vulnerable.

See also
 Boullanger Island dunnart
 List of islands of Western Australia

References

Islands of the Mid West (Western Australia)
Turquoise Coast (Western Australia)
Landmarks in Western Australia
Tourist attractions in Western Australia